The 1946–47 FA Cup was the 66th season of the world's oldest football cup competition, the Football Association Challenge Cup, commonly known as the FA Cup. Charlton Athletic, the previous season's runners-up, won the competition for the first time, beating Burnley 1–0 after extra time in the final at Wembley.

Matches were scheduled to be played at the stadium of the team named first on the date specified for each round, which was always a Saturday. Some matches, however, might be rescheduled for other days if there were clashes with games for other competitions or the weather was inclement. If scores were level after 90 minutes had been played, a replay would take place at the stadium of the second-named team later the same week. If the replayed match was drawn further replays would be held until a winner was determined. If scores were level after 90 minutes had been played in a replay, a 30-minute period of extra time would be played.

Calendar

First round proper

At this stage 43 clubs from the Football League Third Division North and South joined 23 non-league clubs that had advanced through the qualifying rounds. Chester, Cardiff City and Crystal Palace were given a bye to the Third Round. To make the number of matches up, non-league Barnet and Bishop Auckland, the previous season's F. A. Amateur Cup winners and runners-up respectively, were given byes to this round. 34 matches were played on Saturday, 30 November 1946. Six were drawn and went to replays in the following midweek fixture.

Second round proper
The matches were played on Saturday, 14 December 1946. Six matches were drawn, with replays taking place in the following midweek fixture. Two of these then went to a second replay.

Third round proper
The 44 First and Second Division clubs entered the competition at this stage, along with Chester, Cardiff City and Crystal Palace. The matches were scheduled for Saturday, 11 January 1947. Five matches were drawn and went to replays, with one of these requiring a second replay to settle the fixture.

Fourth round proper
The matches were scheduled for Saturday, 25 January 1947. Five games were drawn and went to replays, of which one went to a second replay.

Fifth Round Proper
The matches were scheduled for Saturday, 8 February 1947. There were three replays.

Sixth Round Proper
The four quarter-final ties were scheduled to be played on Saturday, 1 March 1947. There was one replay, in the Burnley–Middlesbrough match.

Semi-finals
The semi-final matches were played on Saturday, 29 March 1947. Burnley and Liverpool needed to replay their match, which was settled two weeks later in Burnley's favour. They went on to meet Charlton Athletic in the final at Wembley.

Replay

Final

The 1947 FA Cup Final was contested by Charlton Athletic and Burnley at Wembley, England on 26 April 1947. Charlton, losing finalists the previous year, won by a single goal, scored in extra time by Chris Duffy.
History repeated itself this year as the ball again burst during the game. Later, the reason for these problems in 1946 and 1947 was put down to the poor quality of leather available after World War II.

Match details

See also
FA Cup Final Results 1872-

References
General
Official site; fixtures and results service at TheFA.com
1946-47 FA Cup at rssf.com
1946-47 FA Cup at soccerbase.com

Specific

 
FA Cup seasons